This article details the qualifying phase for archery at the 2024 Summer Olympics.  The competition at these Games will comprise a total of 128 archers, with an equal distribution between men and women (64 per gender), coming from their respective NOCs; each is permitted to enter a maximum of six archers, three per gender. NOCs that qualify for a gender-based team recurve can select three members to form a squad, ensuring that each of them must compete in the individual recurve.

Twelve slots are available for each gender in the team recurve events, with thirty-six individuals competing against each other through a team-based qualification pathway. While three tickets remain available at the final qualifying meet, the number of quota places at the Worlds has been reduced to three that climb the podium. The other five tickets will be assigned instead to the continental team champions from Europe, Asia, and the Americas, and to the top two teams vying for qualification through the world rankings after the final qualifying meet.

Throughout the process, twenty-eight individual quota places will be awarded to the highest-ranked archers at the 2023 World Championships in Berlin, Germany, the continental Games (European Games, Asian Games, and the Pan American Games), whether mixed team champions or individual recurve gold medalists,  the standalone continental meets (Africa, Europe, Asia, Oceania, and the Americas), and at the final qualification tournament, scheduled for mid-2024.

Host nation France reserves three quota places each for the men's and women's events, along with the mixed team recurve, while four coveted spots are entitled to the eligible NOCs interested to have their archers compete in Paris 2024, as granted by the Universality principle.

To eligibly participate at the Games after obtaining a quota place for NOC, all archers must attain the following minimum qualification standards (MQS) on a 72-arrow, 70-metre round between the first day of the 2023 World Championships and the final entry at a registered World Archery event.
 Men – 70-metre round of 640
 Women – 70-metre round of 610

Qualifying standards 
Qualification occurs through a hierarchy of events instead of dates, so the qualified NOC might vacate the coveted spot through an earlier low-priority meet if it eventually grants a qualifying pathway in a higher-priority event (this particularly affects the European Games, held before the World Championships). The following priority order will be respected from highest to lowest to allocate the quota places: (1) World Championships, (2) continental games, (3) continental championships, (4) final qualification tournaments.

The medal-winning squads (gold, silver, and bronze) in the team event from the 2023 Worlds will secure a quota place for their NOC at the Olympics. If the host country France obtains a team place at the Worlds, the vacant slot will be reallocated to the fourth-place team. Three more tickets will each be assigned to the men's and women's team recurve champions from the 2022 Asian Games, the 2023 European Games, and the 2024 Pan American Championships, respectively. The top three or four NOCs per gender (depending on whether France uses its direct host place or qualifies for the Games through the regular competition pathway) will secure three quota places at the Final Olympic Qualification Tournament (FOQT), scheduled for mid-2024, while the remaining team tickets will be awarded to the two highest-ranked NOCs vying for qualification through the world rankings after FOQT.

Twenty-eight individual quota places will be awarded across the five competition phases and through the universality invitation. Three highest-ranked archers outside the team-based qualification will secure a single quota place for their NOC in the men's and women's individual recurve, respectively, at the 2023 Worlds, while six spots will be assigned to each of the top two archers from Europe, Asia, and the Americas at the continental Games. All five continents will stage standalone continental tournaments throughout the qualifying calendar with a specified number of quota places available: Europe (3) and Asia, Africa, and the Americas (2 each), and Oceania (1). The Final Olympic Qualification Tournament, held at the end of the qualifying period, will allocate two more spots per gender for the highest-ranked eligible archers from their respective NOCs. The remaining tickets in each individual recurve are entitled to the eligible NOCs whose archers are interested to compete in Paris 2024 as duly recognized by the Universality principle.

The mixed team recurve champions from Europe, Asia, Africa, the Americas, and Oceania will obtain a quota place per gender in the individual events for Paris 2024 at their respective continental Games.

Timeline

Qualification summary

Men's events

Women's events

Notes

References

Archery at the 2024 Summer Olympics
Qualification for the 2024 Summer Olympics